Hluhluwe–Imfolozi Park, formerly Hluhluwe–Umfolozi Game Reserve, is the oldest proclaimed nature reserve in Africa. Operated by Ezemvelo KZN Wildlife, the park is the only state-run park in KwaZulu-Natal where each of the big five game animals can be found.

Thanks to conservation efforts, the park now has one of the largest populations of white rhinoceros in the world, although this population remains severely threatened by the poaching of hundreds of rhinos every year in the park.

History

Throughout the park there are many signs of stone age settlements and iron smelting sites. The area is claimed to have been declared a royal hunting ground for the Zulu kingdom in the time of Shaka.

The southern white rhino, first identified by Western naturalist William John Burchell in 1812, was virtually eliminated during the 19th century by European hunters, and by 1895 was believed to be extinct. A population of between 20 and 100 was identified in South Africa and preserved by establishing the Umfolozi Junction Reserve and Hluhluwe Reserve, which are now parts of the Hluhluwe-Imfolozi Park. 

Historically, tsetse flies carrying the nagana disease protected the area from colonial hunters. Later, as the Zululand area was settled by white farmers, wildlife in the reserves was blamed for the prevalence of the tsetse fly, and the reserves became experimental areas in the efforts to eradicate the fly. Farmers called for the slaughter of game and over 100,000 animals were killed in the reserves between 1919 and 1950, although the rhino population was spared. The introduction of DDT spraying in 1945 virtually eliminated the tsetse fly from the reserves, although subsequent outbreaks have occurred. 

By the 1950s the white rhino population of the reserve had recovered to around 400, and the park's warden, Ian Player, established Operation Rhino in the 1950s and 60s, with the park's Rhino Capture Unit relocating hundreds of rhinos to establish populations in other reserves across their historic range. 

In 1989, the corridor between the Hluhluwe and Imfolozi reserves was added in order to join the separate reserves into the current single park.

Geography and climate

The park is located in the province of KwaZulu-Natal on the east coast of South Africa. The park is closest to the town of Mtubatuba , Hluhluwe village and Hlabisa village. The geography of the area differs from the north, or Hluhluwe area, to the south, or Umfolozi area. Hluhluwe–Imfolozi Park is partly in a low-risk malaria area.

Umfolozi
This area is situated between the two Umfolozi Rivers where they divide into the Mfolozi emnyama ('Black Umfolozi') to the north and the Mfolozi emhlophe ('White Umfolozi') to the south. This area is to the south of the park and is generally hot in summer, and mild to cool in winter, although cold spells do occur.
The topography in the Umfolozi section ranges from the lowlands of the Umfolozi River beds to steep hilly country, which includes some wide and deep valleys. Habitats in this area are primarily grasslands, which extend into acacia savannah and woodlands.

Hluhluwe
The high ridges support coastal scarp forests in a well-watered region with valley bushveld at lower levels. The north of the park is more rugged and mountainous with forests and grasslands and is known as the Hluhluwe area, while the Umfolozi area is found to the south near the Black and White Umfolozi rivers where there is open savannah.

Biodiversity

Fauna
The park is home to Africa's big five game: elephant, rhinoceros (black and white), Cape buffalo, lion and leopard. It is home to 86 special species including: Nile crocodile, hippo, cheetah, spotted hyena, blue wildebeest, jackal, giraffe, zebra, waterbuck, nyala, eland, kudu, impala, duiker, suni, reedbuck, common warthog, bushpig, mongoose, baboons, monkeys, a variety of tortoises, terrapins, snakes and lizards.  It is one of the world's top spots for viewing nyala. The park is a prime birding destination and is home to 340 bird species. The Hluhluwe River Flood Plain is one of the only areas in the whole of South Africa where yellow-throated, pink-throated and orange-throated longclaw species can be seen together. Bird life include night heron, Wahlberg's eagle, Shelley's francolin, black-bellied korhaan, Temminck's courser, Klaas's cuckoo, little bee-eater and crested barbet.

Flora
The park has a diverse floral community.

Conservation efforts

Rhinoceros

The park is the birthplace of rhino preservation, having been responsible for breeding the southern white rhinoceros back from near extinction in the first half of the 20th century. There are reportedly 1,600 white rhino in the reserve.

The rhino population remains severely threatened by poaching, with 222 rhinos poached in the province in 2017, most of them in the park. Hluhluwe–Imfolozi has implemented Smart Park which facilitates the integration of systems, including drone technology, for early detection and rapid response of reaction units. On 6 March 2020 two of three suspected rhino poachers were killed in a shootout after they were detected by  infrared cameras. In 2022, 244 rhinos were poached in the province, most of them in the park.

African wild dog
In 1981, the Natal Parks board (now Ezemvelo KZN Wildlife) attempted to reintroduce African wild dogs into the park. Twenty-three dogs were released in the reserve, most of which had been bred in zoos. However this met with limited success and by 2015, the population had fluctuated between 3 and 30 individuals. Further dogs were released into the park in 2022.

Facilities
The first visitor camp was built at Hilltop in 1934, and is now the main camp in the northern (Hluhluwe) section of the park. The main camp in the southern (Umfolozi) section is Mpila. The reserve has a  road network.

Impact of coal mining

The park ecosystems are threatened by the proximity of coal mines, with ongoing applications for prospecting and mine expansions on the western and southern edges of the park.

See also
 Hluhluwe creeper
 Protected areas of South Africa
 South African National Parks

References

External links 

 Ezemvelo KZN Wildlife

Umfolozi River
1895 establishments in the Colony of Natal
Nature reserves in South Africa
Ezemvelo KZN Wildlife Parks
Protected areas established in 1895